Paroled – To Die is a 1938 American Western film directed by Sam Newfield and written by George H. Plympton. The film stars Bob Steele, Kathleen Eliot, Karl Hackett, Horace Murphy, Steve Clark and Budd Buster. The film was released on January 11, 1938, by Republic Pictures.

Plot
Harvey Meline is a con-man who is using money from his own bank to drill an oil well, then one day he finds Doug Redfern's bandana and has his gang rob his own bank and blames it on Doug using his bandana, Doug is convicted but gets paroled, but Meline's plans don't stop there.

Cast
Bob Steele as Doug Redfern
Kathleen Eliot as Joan Blackman
Karl Hackett as Harvey Meline
Horace Murphy as Lucky Gosden
Steve Clark as Sheriff Blackman
Budd Buster as Henchman Spike Travers
James Sheridan as Henchman Matson
Frank Ball as Judge
Jack C. Smith as Prosecuting Attorney

References

External links

1938 films
1930s English-language films
American Western (genre) films
1938 Western (genre) films
Republic Pictures films
Films directed by Sam Newfield
American black-and-white films
Films with screenplays by George H. Plympton
Films about con artists
1930s American films